Myra is the second and major-label debut album by Mexican-American pop singer Myra in the Pop Music Market, released by Buena Vista Records on June 26, 2001. Myra saw two single releases, "Miracles Happen (When You Believe)" and a cover of Martha and the Vandellas' "Dancing in the Street" which were both title tracks for two major motion picture soundtracks released by Disney within the same year.

On April 24, 2002, the album was rereleased in Japan with a new album cover . It contained the same track listing as the American release, but included three additional bonus dance remixes of "Lie, Lie, Lie", which was released as a single exclusively in Japan.

On August 22, 2002, Myra's album was rereleased for a second time in Japan with yet another album cover. The release was retitled "Myra+more," and included the three bonus dance remixes of "Lie, Lie, Lie" and two additional tracks. Those were "Step Into The Light" and "You're the Dream." "Step Into The Light" was featured on the Japanese commercial for Lux Super Rich which featured the Spanish actress, Penélope Cruz. "Step Into the Light" was remixed by Love to Infinity and included on a house music compilation released by Avex Trax.

"You're the Dream" was chosen as the anthem track for the 2002 Special Olympics which was hosted by Walt Disney Records.

Though there was no official single release, the track "Hanging Up On You" was featured on Radio Disney's 'Mighty Music CD' included in McDonald's Mighty Kids Meal packages. The track, "Like A Girl In Love" was also met with promotional release as the third track on Pillsburry/Hollywood Records EP release, "Strudelpalooza: 2002 Event" to promote an event.

Album credits 

According to the album credits included on the US release of Myra, it was mixed and recorded at Angel Recording Studios, World Tree Studios, Bananaboat Studios, Next Faze Studios, Signet Soundelux, Beachhouse Studios, Image Recorders, orange studios, Westlake Audio, Studio D Studios, Larrabee West, and Igloo Studios. It was mastered by Eddy Screyer at Oasis Mastering.

Track listing

Reception
Despite positive reception, live performances, and several TV appearances at the time, Myra failed to be a charting success, only seeking at #47 on the Top Heatseekers chart, this was mostly due to the album being met with very little promotion from Buena Vista/Walt Disney Records. However, the album was met with positive reviews from music critics, many praising the album for being fun, energetic and playful. Both Allmusic and Yahoo! gave the album a three[] out of five stars  rating. As of 2017, the album has gained a cult following mostly due to the popularity of its singles, Miracles Happen (When you Believe) and Dancing in the Street.

Singles

"Dancing in the Street" was the first single, which was also part of Recess: School's Out film soundtrack. The music video was located in a black and white background in Los Angeles, California with Myra and the dancers dancing with a disc jockey playing music with records and is directed by Scott Marshall and choreographed by Darrin Henson. Another version was made where the video is interplaced with clips of the "Green Tambourine" closing sequence of the movie and Myra performing against a bluescreen displaying clips of the film. This version was featured at the end of the VHS of the film.
"Miracles Happen (When You Believe)" was the second single and was also part of The Princess Diaries film soundtrack. The music video was located at The Shoppes at Buckland Hills mall in Connecticut and Myra and the girls go to Limited Too for a fashion and shopping spree and meet up with the boys. It was directed by Scott Marshall and choreographed by Darrin Henson.

2001 debut albums
Buena Vista Records albums
Myra (singer) albums